Adiabene was an ancient kingdom in northern Mesopotamia, corresponding to the northwestern part of ancient Assyria. The size of the kingdom varied over time; initially encompassing an area between the Zab Rivers, it eventually gained control of Nineveh, and starting at least with the rule of Monobazos I (late 1st-century BC), Gordyene became an Adiabenian dependency. It reached its zenith under Izates II, who was granted the district of Nisibis by the Parthian king Artabanus II as a reward for helping him regain his throne. Adiabene's eastern borders stopped at the Zagros Mountains, adjacent to the region of Media. Arbela served as the capital of Adiabene.

The formation of the kingdom is obscure. The first instance of a recorded Adiabenian ruler is in 69 BC, when an unnamed king of Adiabene participated in the battle of Tigranocerta as an ally of the Armenian king Tigranes the Great. However, coinage implies the establishment of a kingdom in Adiabene around 164 BC, following the disintegration of Greek Seleucid rule in the Near East. Adiabene was conquered by the Parthian king Mithridates I in ca. 145–141 BC, and by at least from the reign of Mithridates II served as an integral part of the Parthian realm.

Adiabenian rulers converted to Judaism from paganism in the 1st century AD. Queen Helena of Adiabene (known in Jewish sources as Heleni HaMalka, meaning Helene the Queen) moved to Jerusalem, where she built palaces for herself and her sons, Izates bar Monobaz and Monobaz II at the northern part of the city of David, south of the Temple Mount, and aided the Jews in their war with Rome. According to the Talmud, both Helena and Monobaz donated large funds for the Temple of Jerusalem. After 115 CE, there are no historic traces of Jewish royalty in Adiabene.

The Parthians were overthrown by the Sasanian Empire in 224, who by the time of Shapur I had established their rule in Adiabene. Ardashir II is the last figure to be recorded as king of Adiabene, which implies that the kingdom was after his tenure in  transformed into a province (shahr), governed by a non-royal delegate (marzban or shahrab) of the Sasanian king.

Etymology

Location
Adiabene occupied a district in Median Empire between the Upper Zab (Lycus) and the Lower Zab (Caprus), though Ammianus speaks of Nineveh, Ecbatana, and Gaugamela as also belonging to it. By the late 1st century CE, its borders extended as far as Nisibis. Its chief city was Arbela  (Arba-ilu), where Mar Uqba had a school, or the neighboring Hazzah, by which name the later Arabs also called Arbela.

In Kiddushin 72a the Biblical Habor is identified with Adiabene, but in Yerushalmi Megillah i. 71b with Riphath. In the Targum to Jeremiah li. 27, Ararat, Minni, and Ashkenaz are paraphrased by Kordu, Harmini, and Hadayab, i.e., Corduene, Armenia, and Adiabene; while in Ezekiel xxvii. 23 Harran, Caneh, and Eden are interpreted by the Aramaic translator as "Harwan, Nisibis, and Adiabene."

Population
Adiabene had a mixed population of Assyrians, Arabs, Arameans, Greeks, and Iranians. Adiabene was a major-speaking Syriac language kingdom. According to Pliny, four tribes inhabited the region of Adiabene: Orontes, Alani, Azones and Silices. The account of Josephus' Antiquities of the Jews shows that there was a substantial Jewish population in the kingdom. The difficult mixing of cultures can be seen in the story of the martyrdom of Mahanuš, a prominent Iranian Zoroastrian who converted to Christianity. In later times Adiabene became an archbishopric, with the seat of the metropolitan at Arbela.

Based on names of the Adiabenian rulers, Ernst Herzfeld suggested a Saka/Scythian origin for the royal house of the kingdom; however, later progress in Iranian linguistic studies showed that these names were common west middle Iranian names. It has been suggested that the royal house of Adiabene, after fleeing Trajan's invasion, established the later Amatuni dynasty which ruled the area between the lakes Urmia and Van.

Adiabene was a district in Mesopotamia between upper and lower Zab and was a part of the Neo Assyrian Empire and inhabited by Assyrians even after the fall of Nineveh. It was an integral part of Achaemenid Assyria (Athura) and Sasanian Assyria (Assuristan). The region was later made a part of the Roman province of Assyria after the invasion by Trajan in 116.

According to Patricia Crone and Michael Cook, when the heartland of Assyria was back into focus in early Christianity (during the Parthian era and about six centuries after the fall of the Assyrian Empire), "it was with an Assyrian, not a Persian let alone Greek, self-identification: the temple of Ashur was restored, the city was rebuilt, and an Assyrian successor state that returned in the shape of the client kingdom of Adiabene." The Jewish historian Flavius Josephus states that the inhabitants of Adiabene were Assyrians.

(For subsequent history, see Erbil; Assyrian people, Roman Empire, Iraq).

History

Achaemenid Persian Empire
Under the Achaemenid Persian kings, Adiabene seems for a time to have been a vassal state of the Persian Empire. At times the throne of Adiabene was held by a member of the Achaemenid house; Ardashir III (king from 628 to 630 CE), before he came to the throne of Persia, had the title "King of Hadyab". The Ten Thousand, an army of Greek mercenaries, retreated through Adiabene on their march to the Black Sea after the Battle of Cunaxa.

Queen Helena's conversion to Judaism
According to Jewish tradition, Helena, the Queen of Adiabene converted to Judaism from paganism in the 1st century. Queen Helena of Adiabene (known in Jewish sources as ) moved to Jerusalem where she built palaces for herself and her sons, Izates bar Monobaz and Monobaz II at the northern part of the city of David, south of the Temple Mount, and aided Jews in their war with Rome. Queen Helena's sarcophagus was discovered in 1863. A pair of inscriptions on the sarcophagus, "tzaddan malka" and "tzadda malkata," is believed to be a reference to the provisions (tzeda in Hebrew) that Helena supplied to Jerusalem's poor and to the Jewish kingdom in general. According to Josephus, the queen converted to Judaism together with her son Monobaz II, under the influence of two Jews. Another tradition has it that she met a Jewish jewelry merchant in Adiabene by the name of Hanania or Eliezer, who told her about the people of Israel and persuaded her to join them. All historic traces of Jewish royalty in Adiabne ended around 115 CE, but these stories made huge impact on rabbinic literature and Talmud. Nominally Zoroastrian, the people of Adiabne were tolerant toward Judaism, and permitted the establishment of Jewish communities there, The Jews of Edessa, Nisibis, and Adiabene repaid them by being among the most vigorous opponents of Trajan. In late second century Christianity rapidly spread among Zoroastrians and those formerly professing Judaism. When Christianity became the official religion of the Roman empire under Constantine, the position of Adiabenian Christians was naturally exacerbated, since they were seen as potentially disaffected by the zealously Zoroastrian Sasanians.

Hellenistic Period
The little kingdom may have had a series of native rulers nominally vassal to the Macedonian, Seleucid  and later Armenian (under Tigranes the Great) empires.

Parthian Empire
It later became one of the client kingdoms of the Parthian empire. During the 1st century BCE and the 1st century CE, it gained a certain prominence under a series of kings descended from Monobaz I and his son Izates I. Monobaz I is known to have been allied with king Abennerig of Characene, in whose court his son Izates II bar Monobaz lived for a time and whose daughter Symacho Izates married, as well as the rulers of other small kingdoms on the periphery of the Parthian sphere of influence.

Roman intermezzo (117-118)

The chief opponent of Trajan in Mesopotamia during the year 115 was the last king of independent Adiabene, Meharaspes. He had made common cause with Ma'nu (Mannus) of Singar (Singara). Trajan invaded Adiabene, and made it part of the Roman province of Assyria; under Hadrian in 117, however, Rome gave up possession of Assyria, Mesopotamia, and Armenia.

In the summer of 195 Septimius Severus was again warring in Mesopotamia, and in 196 three divisions of the Roman army fell upon Adiabene. According to Dio Cassius, Caracalla took Arbela in the year 216, and searched all the graves there, wishing to ascertain whether the Arsacid kings were buried there. Many of the ancient royal tombs were destroyed.

Sasanian rule
Despite the overthrow of the Parthians by the Sasanians in 224 CE, the feudatory dynasties remained loyal to the Parthians, and resisted Sasanian advance into Adiabene and Atropatene. Due to this, and religious differences, Adiabene was never regarded as an integral part of Iran, even though the Sasanians controlled it for several centuries.

After the Roman Empire gradually made Christianity its official religion during the fourth century, the inhabitants of Adiabene, who were primarily Assyrian Christians, sided with Christian Rome rather than the Zoroastrian Sasanians. The Byzantine Empire sent armies to the region during the Byzantine–Sasanian wars, but this did nothing to change the territorial boundaries. Adiabene remained a province of the Sasanians Empire until the Muslim conquest of Persia.

The region was recorded as Nod-Ardadkhshiragan or Nod-Ardashiragan in Sasanian period.

Bishops
Between the 5th and the 14th centuries Adiabene was a metropolitan province of the Assyrian Church of the East. The Chronicle of Erbil, a purported history of Christianity in Adiabene under the Parthians and Sasanians, lists a number of early bishops of Erbil. The authenticity of the Chronicle of Erbil has been questioned, and scholars remain divided on how much credence to place in its evidence. Some of the bishops in the following list are attested in other sources, but the early bishops are probably legendary.

 Pkidha (104–114)
 Semsoun (120–123)
 Isaac (135–148)
 Abraham (148–163)
 Noh (163–179)
 Habel (183–190)
 Abedhmiha (190–225)
 Hiran of Adiabene (225–258)
 Saloupha (258–273)
 Ahadabuhi (273–291)
 Sri'a (291–317)
 Iohannon (317–346)
 Abraham (346–347)
 Maran-zkha (347–376)
 Soubhaliso (376–407)
 Daniel (407–431)
 Rhima (431–450)
 Abbousta (450–499)
 Joseph (499–511)
 Huana (511–?)

See also
 Adiabene (East Syrian Ecclesiastical Province)
 Assuristan
 Assyria (Roman province)
 Osroene
 Sennacherib II
 Nor Shirakan
 List of kings of Adiabene

Notes

References

References
  (2 volumes)
 
 
 

 
 
 
 Brauer, E., The Jews of Kurdistan, Wayne State University Press, Detroit, 1993.
 Solomon Grayzel, A History of the Jews,New York: Mentor, 1968.
 Gottheil, Richard. "Adiabene". Jewish Encyclopedia. Funk and Wagnalls, 1901-1906.; which cites:
 Josephus, Jewish Antiquities xx. 2, § 4;
 idem, Wars of the Jews. ii. 19, § 2; iv. 9, § 11; v. 2, § 2; 3, § 3; 4, § 2; 6, § 1, noting that Josephus probably got his information from Adiabenian Jews in Jerusalem (Von Gutschmid, Kleine Schriften, iii. 4).
 Pliny the Elder, Historia Naturalis, v. 66, vi. 44 et seq.
 Ammianus, History, xviii. 7, § 1; xxiii. 6, § 21
 Strabo, Geography, xvi. 745 et seq.
 Brüll, Adiabene, in Jahrbuch i. 58 et seq.
 Grätz, Heinrich, in Monatsschrift, 1877, xxvi. 241 et seq., 289 et seq.
 Von Gutschmid, Gesch. Irans, pp. 140 et seq.
 Schürer, Gesch. ii. 562.

External links
 Bishops of Adiabene
 History of Aramaic (includes references to Adiabene)
 The forced conversion of the Jewish community of Persia and the beginnings of the Kurds 
 "Assyria" at Livius.org 
 "Arbela" at Livius.org
 Adiabene, Jewish Kingdom of Mesopotamia (different page see above)
 Info from Jewish Encyclopedia

 
Provinces of the Sasanian Empire
Parthian Empire
116 disestablishments
States and territories established in the 2nd century BC
States and territories disestablished in the 4th century
Groups who converted to Judaism
Post-Imperial Assyria
Former kingdoms